John McGuirk (born 2 March 1984) is an Irish writer and political commentator. He is the editor of Gript, a website that has been described as conservative, far-right, and right-wing. McGuirk is also a regular contributor to The Irish Catholic.

Career
He has worked in various public relations roles and as a communications manager for Declan Ganley's Rivada Networks. He has been the editor of Gript Media, which describes its primary aim as supporting news and debate "without the liberal filter," since 2020.  He also writes for the Irish Catholic. McGuirk has appeared as a guest on Irish broadcast media, including The Last Word and Tonight with Vincent Browne.

Political career
McGuirk was a member of Ógra Fianna Fáil, of which he was national policy coordinator before resigning after a meeting at Fianna Fáil headquarters following leaking of e-mails in August 2003. He subsequently joined Fine Gael but resigned in 2007 after issues around a press release criticising the party leader with regard to Crumlin Children's Hospital; he later rejoined, then left again.

McGuirk was elected unopposed as Eastern Area Officer of the Union of Students in Ireland in 2006. The following year, he unsuccessfully sought the position of president of the USI.

He was communications director for the Libertas Institute during its 2008 campaign against the twenty-eighth amendment of the constitution of Ireland.  Turnout was 53.1% and the amendment was rejected by a 53.4% majority.  McGuirk's involvement with Libertas continued through 2009, when the amendment was  revised and approved by a 67.1% majority nationally with 59% turnout.  During the campaign, McGuirk tweeted a photo of pro-choice campaigners at a march, who were carrying posters featuring the logo used by the British Union of Fascists in the 1930s. It later emerged that these posters had been handed out to marchers who did not recognise the symbol, by anti-abortion campaigners as part of what was described by the Sunday Times as "a dirty trick straight from Richard Nixon’s playbook". When Libertas contested the 2009 European elections with three candidates, McGuirk issued a press release attacking the Simon Wiesanthal Centre without the approval of the relevant candidate, and later attacked the same candidate in strong personal terms in a Facebook post, before apologising.

In the 2011 Irish general election, McGuirk ran as the New Vision candidate for Cavan–Monaghan. He received 2.4% of first preferences and was eliminated on the second count.

He was spokesman for Save the 8th, a campaign from the Life Institute, which unsuccessfully campaigned against the thirty-sixth amendment of the constitution of Ireland to preserve a constitutional protection of the life of the unborn. During the campaign, McGuirk stated "If Dublin Central is 75% yes on the day (3-1), I will never take a political job again".  76.5% of votes cast in Dublin Central supported 'Yes', and the referendum was approved by 66.4% of voters nationally.

Views and controversies
McGuirk has been criticised for his characterisation of opponents, such as stating that Colm O'Gorman, head of Amnesty International Ireland, was a "cretinous stain on the Irish national discourse who’ll say whatever Soros pays [him] to" and the description of a pro-choice TD, Kate O'Connell, as a "catty, spiteful, loathsome twit" after the TD shared screengrabs of misogynistic tweets from a member of the Fine Gael National Executive.

In January 2020, McGuirk defended Gript's link to the firm AggregateIQ, which had been found to have broken privacy laws during the Brexit campaign, and was also involved in profiling of Gript readers.

In the wake of violence at anti-lockdown and anti-vaccine protests by far-right groups in Dublin in February 2021, McGuirk defended those opposed to Ireland's pandemic measures.

In March 2021, RTÉ paid €20,000 to charities nominated by the republican socialist party Éirígí after McGuirk, on an episode of Prime Time, falsely linked the group to the killing of the journalist Lyra McKee in Derry in 2019. McGuirk later apologised on social media, saying, "I got my Republican groups mixed up badly in a slip of the tongue. It was of course Saoradh, not Eirigi (sic), who were connected to the murder of Lyra McKee. I want to apologise publicly to Eirigi (sic) for the error, and thank RTE (sic) for correcting it." He was criticised by McKee's partner, Sara Canning, who said, "It's bad enough seeing tons of generally right-wing people using Lyra's name as a stick to beat everyone from Nicola Sturgeon to Nancy Pelosi, and now John McGuirk using Lyra's murder, on national TV, & without having the facts straight?! Enraging."

In 2022, McGuirk sued Paddy Cosgrave for defamation for Tweets posted in December 2021.

References 

1984 births
Alumni of Trinity College Dublin
Fianna Fáil politicians
Fine Gael politicians
Irish anti-abortion activists
Irish columnists
Irish journalists
Living people
People from County Monaghan